Paduka Sri Sultan Mu'adzam Shah ibni al-Marhum Sultan Mudzaffar Shah I (died 10 May 1202; also spelt Sultan Mu'azzam Shah) was the second Sultan of Kedah. His reign was from 1179 to 1202.

External links
 List of Sultans of Kedah

1202 deaths
12th-century Sultans of Kedah
13th-century Sultans of Kedah